Karditsa is a city in western Thessaly in mainland Greece. The city of Karditsa is the capital of Karditsa regional unit of region of Thessaly.

Inhabitation is attested from 9000 BC. Karditsa ls linked with GR-30, the road to Karpenisi, and the road to Palamas and Larissa. Karditsa is south-west of Palamas and Larissa, west of Farsala and the Volos area, north-west of Athens, Lamia, Domokos and Sofades, north of Karpenisi, north-east of Arta, and east-south-east of Trikala, Grevena, Ioannina, and Kalampaka.

Karditsa has elementary schools, high schools, junior high schools, the Veterinary Medicine Department of the University of Thessaly which is one of only two Veterinary departments in Greece, three other university departments of the University of Thessaly, churches, banks, a post office, a railway station, a sports ground, a water tower, and squares. Karditsa is one of the most bicycle-friendly cities in Greece with an extensive network of bicycle paths. Approximately 30% of all the city transportation, according to the National Technical University of Athens, is done by bicycles.

Climate

Karditsa has a hot-summer Mediterranean climate (Köppen climate classification: Csa). Karditsa experiences hot, dry summers and cool winters with substantial precipitation.

History

During the period of Ottoman rule in Thessaly, the main settlement in the location of modern Karditsa was called Sotira. In 1810, the English traveler William Martin Leake mentioned a sprawling village named Kardhítza, consisting of between 500-600 houses, of which the majority of the inhabitants were Turkish.

Karditsa was incorporated as a new city in 1882, the year after its liberation from the Ottoman Empire.

During World War II, the resistance in Thessaly was fought primarily by the ELAS. On March 12, 1943 Karditsa was liberated temporarily by ELAS after the Italian capitulation.

In September 2020, the city was badly hit from catastrophic floods that resulted in 4 deaths.

Municipality
The municipality Karditsa was formed at the 2011 local government reform by the merger of the following 5 former municipalities, that became municipal units:
Itamos
Kallifoni
Kampos
Karditsa
Mitropoli

The municipality has an area of 647.3878 km2, the municipal unit 110.086 km2. Formerly, Karditsa had a neighbourhood known as Vlachomahalas, which was populated by Vlachs (Aromanians).

Subdivisions
The municipal unit of Karditsa is divided into six parts (communities):
Agiopigi
Artesiano
Karditsa
Karditsomagoula
Palioklissi
Rousso

Historical population

Education
Veterinary Medicine Department of the University of Thessaly which is one of only two Veterinary departments in Greece and three other university departments of the University of Thessaly based in the city.

Transport
Karditsa is served by trains on the Palaiofarsalos-Kalambaka line, with connections to both Athens and Thessaloniki.

Sports
Karditsa has many clubs in various sport. The most of them are active in football such as Anagennisi Karditsa, AO Karditsa, Asteras Karditsa and Elpides Karditsas. The club SPA Karditsa is active in volleyball.

People

Ioannis Bourousis, Greek basketball player
Antigoni Drisbioti, Greek Olympian race walker
Charilaos Florakis, Secretary General of the Communist Party of Greece
Georgios Karaiskakis, hero of the Greek War of Independence
Alexandros Papamichail, Greek Olympian race walker
Helena Paparizou, Greek singer and winner of 2005 Eurovision Song Contest
Nikolaos Plastiras, Greek army officer and Prime Minister
Georgios Siantos, communist politician, Greek Resistance figure
Dimitris Sioufas, Greek politician and former speaker of the Hellenic parliament
Dimitrios Tsiamis, Greek triple jumper, bronze medalist at European Championships
Panagiota Tsinopoulou, Greek Olympian race walker
Seraphim of Athens, Archbishop of Athens and All Greece from 1974 to 1998
Stefanos Tsitsipas, Greek tennis player

See also
 Fanari, Karditsa

Gallery

References

External links

Karditsa Wireless Metropolitan Network, Karditsas Wifi Community Network (in Greek)

 
Greek prefectural capitals
Municipalities of Thessaly
Populated places in Karditsa (regional unit)